Star Karaorman is a village in the municipality of Štip, North Macedonia.

Demographics
As of the 2021 census, Star Karaorman had 924 residents with the following ethnic composition:
Macedonians 791
Persons for whom data are taken from administrative sources 82
Aromanians 49
Serbs 2

According to the 2002 census, the village had a total of 911 inhabitants. Ethnic groups in the village include:
Macedonians 840
Serbs 3
Aromanians 67
Other 1

References

Villages in Štip Municipality